The de Havilland Ghost (originally Halford H-2) was the de Havilland Engine Company's second design of a turbojet engine to enter production and the world's first gas turbine engine to enter airline service (with BOAC). The Ghost powered the de Havilland Venom, de Havilland Comet and SAAB 29 Tunnan. It was a scaled-up development of the Goblin.

He was flying a Vampire Mk I modified by replacement of the Goblin engine with a Ghost engine, and installation of extended wing tips.

Design and development

The Ghost originated when de Havilland started work on what was to become the Comet in 1943. Frank Halford's first design, the H-1, was just entering production and he was able to meet the power requirements of the Comet by scaling up the H-1. The resulting H-2 used ten larger combustion chambers in place of the Goblin's sixteen smaller ones, using bifurcated "split intakes" which were fed by each diffuser duct to effectively make twenty inlets. While the prototype was being built, de Havilland bought Halford's firm and reformed it as the de Havilland Engine Company, renaming the H-1 and H-2 as the Goblin and Ghost respectively.

The Ghost was running in 1944, and flew in 1945. This was long before the Comet or Venom was ready for flight. By this point the Ghost had been selected for the Swedish "JxR" fighter project, which eventually turned into the Tunnan. During the design of the Tunnan, Sweden received German data on swept wing designs via Switzerland and redesigned the plane to incorporate this planform. The Tunnan first flew in this form in 1948. For production versions of the Tunnan, the Ghost was built under licence by Svenska Flygmotor (later to become Volvo Aero) as the RM2. The Ghost was also licence built in Italy by Fiat and in Switzerland by Sulzer Brothers.

The Ghost would next be seen when the Comet I first took to the air on 27 July 1949. It was powered by the  Ghost 50, which was the interim powerplant, pending the availability of the Rolls-Royce Avon engine which was to be used in the Comet 2. Several versions of the Ghost 50 were produced, ending with the Ghost 50-Mk.4 installed in the Comet 1XB which was built to test new fuselage construction techniques introduced to address problems with the Comet 1.

During development, the Royal Air Force also asked for an improved version of the de Havilland Vampire with greater load-carrying capacity and thus a larger engine. The resulting design was known as the Venom, and shared many features with the earlier Vampire. The Ghost first flew in the Venom on 2 September 1949. The Venom was used primarily as a fighter bomber, although some were also produced as night fighters. The Venom was later selected by the Fleet Air Arm for their interceptor needs, and was widely used as the Sea Venom.

Variants

Ghost 3 (DGt.3)
Ghost 45rated at 
Ghost 48 Mk.1(103) rated at 
Ghost 48 Mk.2(104)
Ghost 50 Mk 2rated at 
Ghost 53 Mk 1(105)
Ghost 103rated at 
Ghost 104rated at 
Ghost 105rated at 
Svenska Flygmotor RM2 Licence production and development  at 10,250 rpm
Svenska Flygmotor RM2B RM2 with afterburner  wet at 10,250 rpm;  dry at 10,250 rpm.
Fiat 4001 (Ghost 48 Mk.1) Fiat licence production.

Applications
 de Havilland Comet 
 de Havilland Venom 
 de Havilland Sea Venom
 "Ghost-Lancastrian"
 Saab Tunnan
 Crusader (speedboat)

Specifications (Ghost 105)

See also

References

Further reading

External links

 
 

Ghost
1940s turbojet engines
Centrifugal-flow turbojet engines